Korshavn Bay is a bay of northeastern Funen, Denmark, near the village of Nordskov. A small bay, it lies in the peninsula of Fyns Hoved, just to the south of the bight, and contains the Korshavn Light. The bay provides natural shelter to boaters.

References

Bays of Denmark
Geography of Funen
Ports and harbours of Denmark
Geography of Kerteminde Municipality